Brigadier General James Roy Andersen (May 10, 1904 – February 26, 1945) was a United States Army Air Forces officer. He was declared killed in action after an aircraft accident on February 26, 1945, over the Pacific Ocean.

Background

Andersen was born in Racine, Wisconsin,  on May 10, 1904, the son of Niels and Inger (Klausen) Andersen. He graduated from Racine High School in 1922.

He graduated from the United States Military Academy on the Hudson River at West Point, New York, on June 12, 1926, fourth in his class. Shortly after graduating, married his high school sweetheart, Esther Katherine Hau. He then joined the 2nd Infantry at Fort Sheridan Illinois for 2 years, then served 3 years at Schofield Barracks, Hawaii; 3 years at Aberdeen (Maryland) Proving Ground Command and Picatinny Arsenal, New Jersey; one year in Boston, and one year at Selfridge Field, Michigan, plus one year in San Antonio, Texas. He graduated from the Massachusetts Institute of Technology in 1934 with a Master of Science degree. He spent 6 years in the infantry and 3 years in ordinance before entering into flight school. In 1936, he was promoted to captain and obtained his wings at Kelly Field, Texas and assigned to Hickam Field, Hawaii. During World War II, he returned to West Point as an instructor, with promotion to colonel by early 1943. During 1943-1944 he served on the U.S. War Department General Staff. In January 1945, Andersen was promoted to brigadier general and assigned to HQ AAF, Pacific Ocean Area.

Disappearance
Andersen is believed to have died on February 26, 1945, in an aircraft accident near Kwajalein Island. He and Lieutenant General Millard Harmon were traveling on Consolidated C-87A Liberator Express serial number 41-24174, which disappeared between Kwajalein and Johnston Island while en route to Hawaii. The pilot of the aircraft was F. E. Savage.

Legacy
Andersen Air Force Base in the United States territory of Guam is named in his memory.

Career

Service
1940-07-01 – 1942-XX-XX - Instructor at Department of Chemistry & Electricity, US Military Academy West Point
1942-03-XX – 1943-06-XX - Director of Training at the Army Air Force Basic Advanced Flying School
1943-06-XX – 1944-08-XX - Attached to Plans Division, War Department General Staff
1944-08-XX – 1945-02-26 - Chief of Staff, US Army Air Forces Pacific Ocean Areas
1945-02-26 – Lost an airplane crash at sea
1945-03-17 – Search abandoned
1946-02-27 – Declared dead

Promotions
1942-01-05 Lieutenant-Colonel (Army of the United States)
1942-03-01 Colonel (Army of the United States)
1943-06-12 Major
1945-01-21 Brigadier-General (Army of the United States)

Awards and decorations

See also
List of people who disappeared mysteriously at sea

References

External links

 Biography Page

1904 births
1940s missing person cases
1945 deaths
Aerial disappearances of military personnel in action
Military personnel from Wisconsin
Missing in action of World War II
Missing people
Missing person cases in the United States
People from Racine, Wisconsin
People lost at sea
United States Army Air Forces generals of World War II
United States Army Air Forces generals
United States Army Air Forces personnel killed in World War II
Victims of aviation accidents or incidents in 1945